Huntington Bancshares Incorporated is an American bank holding company headquartered in Columbus, Ohio. The company is ranked 521st on the Fortune 500, and is 26th on the list of largest banks in the United States.

The company's banking subsidiary, The Huntington National Bank, operates 1047 banking offices, primarily in the Midwest: 459 in Ohio, 290 in Michigan, 80 in Minnesota, 51 in Pennsylvania, 45 in Indiana, 35 in Illinois, 32 in Colorado, 29 in West Virginia, 16 in Wisconsin  and 10 in Kentucky. In January 2009, the bank's Board of Directors named Steve Steinour as president, CEO, and chairman, succeeding Thomas Hoaglan, who retired after eight years in those positions.

At the end of the 2021 fiscal year, Huntington was the nation's #1 originator of SBA 7(a) loans.

History
P. W. Huntington formed P. W. Huntington & Company in 1866, operating on the northwest corner of High and Broad Streets; the site now houses the regional headquarters for rival U.S. Bancorp. Huntington built its first five-story building in 1878, on the intersection's southwest corner. Four out of five sons of P. W. would become partners during the 1890s and early 1900s. The bank was incorporated in 1905 as The Huntington National Bank of Columbus. Huntington died in 1918 shortly after turning the bank over to his sons.

Francis Huntington became president and provided active leadership for 14 years. In 1915, the bank received limited trust powers. In 1922, the bank received full trust powers from the Federal Reserve System. In 1923, Huntington purchased Columbus-based the State Savings Bank & Trust Company and the Hayden-Clinton National Bank of Columbus, swelling its capital base.

In 1958, Huntington acquired the Columbus-based The Market Exchange Bank Company. In 1962, Huntington acquired both First National Bank of Grove City and The People's Bank of Canal Winchester. In 1963, Huntington acquired both The Columbus Savings Bank and the Columbus-based The Northern Savings Bank. In 1966, Huntington Bancshares Incorporated (HBI) was established as a bank holding company.

In 1967, Huntington Bancshares acquired the Washington Court House-based The Washington Savings Bank. In 1969, it acquired the Ashland-based Farmers Bank. In 1970, it also acquired the Bowling Green-based The Bank of Wood County Company, the Toledo-based The Lucas County State Bank, and Lagonda National Bank of Springfield. In 1971, Huntington Bancshares acquired First National Bank & Trust Company of Lima, The Woodville State Bank, and the Kent-based The Portage National Bank. In 1972, it acquired The First National Bank of Wadsworth and The First National Bank of Kenton, also establishing the first 24-hour, fully automated banking office.

In 1973, Alger Savings Bank merged into an affiliate in Kenton, Ohio. In 1976, The Huntington Mortgage Company formed as a subsidiary of Huntington Bancshares with The Pickerington Bank being merged into the bank. In 1977, Huntington Bancshares acquired The Bellefontaine National Bank, The Central National Bank of London, and Columbus-based The Franklin National Bank. In 1979, a loan production office opened in Dayton, Ohio.

In 1975, the company changed its logo to its current "honeycomb" logo.

In 1980, Farmers & Merchants Bank, Milford Center and The First National Bank of Burton were merged with Huntington Bancshares.

In 1981, the bank acquired Alexandria Bank Company and renamed it The Huntington State Bank, with a loan production office opening in Cincinnati.

In 1982, the bank merged with the Reeves Banking and Trust Company. Huntington acquired the tiny Savings Bank of Chillicothe, Ohio in the early 1980s, which gained some fame in 2011 when 100-year-old June Gregg revealed to Huntington officials that her father had opened a savings account for her as a baby with Savings Bank in 1913 and that she had subsequently kept the account open. Huntington officials later confirmed it and gave her account a temporary increase in her interest rate to 5% as a centenarian present for her 98-year loyalty to Huntington and the Chillicothe branch's predecessor, Savings Bank.

In 1983, the bank acquired Cleveland-based Union Commerce Bank.

In 1997, the bank acquired First Michigan Bank Corporation of Holland, Michigan.

In 2002, the company sold its branches in Florida to SunTrust Banks for $705 million.

In March 2006, the company acquired Unizan Financial.

In July 2007, the company acquired Sky Financial Group Inc. based in Bowling Green, Ohio, which increased its presence in Indiana and Ohio and expanded it into Western Pennsylvania for the first time. As of 2021, Huntington is the sixth-largest bank in the Pittsburgh market by deposits.

In November 2008, the United States Department of the Treasury invested $1.4 billion in the company as part of the Troubled Asset Relief Program and in December 2010, the company repaid the Treasury. The U.S. government made a profit of over $144 million from its investment in the company.

In 2009, Huntington bid against rival Fifth Third Bank to acquire National City Corp. branches in the Pittsburgh region from PNC Financial Services. The United States Department of Justice ordered PNC to sell the branches to comply with United States antitrust law concerns after the National City acquisition by PNC. Ultimately, PNC sold the overlapping branches to First Niagara Bank.

On October 3, 2009, the Federal Deposit Insurance Corporation named Huntington as receiver of a $400 million deposit portfolio from the bank failure of Warren Bank in Warren, Michigan.

On December 18, 2009, Huntington signed a 45-day lease with the FDIC to run a bridge bank for the failed Citizens State Bank in New Baltimore, Michigan.

In June 2011, three wordmarks and 2 icons were placed on the top of the 200 Public Square building in Cleveland, Ohio. The Building was formerly named the BP Building and was headquarters to SOHIO from 1985 to 2011, when the logo was put on the building.

In March 2012, the bank acquired Dearborn-based Fidelity Bank.

In 2012, Huntington was in merger discussions with Flint, Michigan-based Citizens Republic Bancorp. Discussions stalled and FirstMerit, which was itself acquired by Huntington in 2016, purchased Citizens Republic in September 2012.

In the first quarter of 2013, Huntington changed its ATMs to new ones that allow customers to make deposits by inserting cash and checks directly into the ATM. The bank started in 2014 offering ATM deposits from mobile phones and through online transfers until 11:59 p.m. and post them that day.

In March 2014, the company acquired Ohio-based Camco Financial, holding company for Advantage Bank, for $97 million in stock.

In September 2014, the company acquired 24 offices of Bank of America in Central Michigan, including the Port Huron, Flint, and Saginaw markets. This raised the number of Huntington branches in Michigan to 173, including over 40 locations housed in Meijer stores.

In March 2015, the company acquired Michigan-based Macquarie Equipment Finance, Inc. from Sydney, Australia-based Macquarie Group for $458 million.

In January 2016, Huntington announced it would purchase Akron-based FirstMerit Corporation for $3.4 billion, making the FirstMerit Tower in Akron, Ohio, have the Huntington word mark on it, and making it one of the largest banks in Ohio. Due to Sherman Antitrust Act concerns by the United States Department of Justice, it sold 11 branches in Canton and two in Ashtabula to First Commonwealth Bank. Additionally, 107 branches located within 2.5 miles of other Huntington / FirstMerit branches were closed.

In June 2022, Huntington completed its acquisition of Capstone Partners, an investment bank and advisory firm based in Boston.

Historic checks
In 2012, Huntington started displaying old checks that were written by famous people, including 24 former U.S. Presidents such as Abraham Lincoln, George Washington, Thomas Jefferson, Andrew Jackson, Theodore Roosevelt, Franklin Roosevelt, and Niles, Ohio native William McKinley. Other checks were signed by Charles Dickens, Thomas Edison, Ernest Hemingway, and Susan B. Anthony, among others. The most notable check was one written by Lincoln to "self" for $800 dated April 13, 1865, the day before his assassination. The checks are estimated to be worth over $75,000 today. Huntington acquired the checks in 1983 when it purchased Union Commerce Bank and received several boxes of old documents, but weren't discovered until 2011 when a Huntington employee was looking through the documents.

Huntington Preferred Capital
Huntington Bancshares also operates Huntington Preferred Capital, Inc., a real estate investment trust (REIT). It was organized under Ohio law in 1992 and designated as a REIT in 1998. Four related parties own HPCI's common stock: Huntington Capital Financing LLC; Huntington Preferred Capital II, Inc.; Huntington Preferred Capital Holdings, Inc.; and Huntington Bancshares Incorporated. All these entities are tied via ownership and/or interlocking directorships to Huntington Bancshares, either directly or through Huntington National Bank.

In addition to the common stock, Huntington Preferred Capital also issued two million shares of preferred stock, paying a quarterly cash dividend of $0.4925 per share. This stock is largely held by the same companies as the common stock, but a small fraction of the available shares are sold on the open market. Huntington Preferred Capital had one subsidiary, HPCLI, Inc., a taxable REIT subsidiary formed in March 2001 for the purpose of holding certain assets (primarily leasehold improvements). On December 31, 2007, Huntington Preferred Capital paid common stock dividends consisting of cash and the stock of HPCLI to its common stock shareholders. After the stock dividend was paid, HPCLI became a wholly owned subsidiary of Huntington Preferred Capital Holdings, which holds all the shares of HPCLI.

TCF merger
On December 13, 2020, Huntington announced a merger with Detroit-based TCF Bank. Under the terms of the merger agreement, the bank would retain the Huntington name and the company and retail bank would remain headquartered in Columbus. As part of the merger, the company also announced it would close 198 branches due to overlap. This included all 97 branches located inside Meijer stores in Michigan. Regulators announced on May 26, 2021 that TCF Bank would be required by the Department of Justice to sell 13 branches in Michigan.  These branches were purchased by Horizon Bank at the end of the third quarter. The final approval was given for the merger and it was completed on June 9, 2021. The combined bank has $175 billion in assets.

The company's retail banking business remains headquartered in Columbus. The company's commercial banking business is based in the TCF Building in downtown Detroit, which was renamed the Huntington Tower. The building was originally intended to house Chemical Financial prior to its merger with TCF. The building houses 800 employees of the combined company.

The merger allowed Huntington to enter Minnesota and Colorado for the first time. The merged bank has 1,100 branches stretching from West Virginia to Colorado; its most important markets are Columbus, Detroit, Minneapolis-St. Paul, and Chicago. The merger also led to the closure of TCF Bank's only branch in South Dakota. TCF branches were converted in the fourth quarter of 2021.

Sponsorships
Huntington owns the naming rights to:
 Huntington Bank Pavilion in Chicago
 Huntington Bank Stadium in Minneapolis
 Huntington Center in Toledo 
 Huntington Convention Center of Cleveland
 Huntington Park in Columbus
Huntington Place in Detroit

See also

References

Further reading

External links

 
1866 establishments in Ohio
American companies established in 1866
Banks established in 1866
Banks based in Ohio
Companies based in the Columbus, Ohio metropolitan area
Companies listed on the Nasdaq